Mary Bettans (?–?), was a fashionable British dressmaker. She was the official royal dressmaker of Queen Victoria.

Mary Bettans had her establishment at 84 Jermyn Street in London. In 1841, her business was described as "well conducted establishment" with journeywomen, in-door apprentices and improvers.

Bettans had a long association with Victoria, making mourning clothes for her on the death of her father in 1820, as well as her wedding dress twenty years later. In the 1846 official calendar, Elizabeth Johnston had the title "Dress Maker Extraordinary" while Mary Bettans was called "Court Dress and Dress Maker". They were not the queen's only dressmaker, as she was also known to be the client of the  House of Creed as well as John Redfern.

References 

19th-century English businesspeople
19th-century English businesswomen
British tailors
British women fashion designers
Queen Victoria
Year of birth missing
Year of death missing
British fashion designers